This is a list of castles and forts in the Channel Islands.

Guernsey

Guernsey
Castle Cornet
Fort Doyle
Fort George
Fort Grey
Fort Le Marchant
Fort Pembroke, Guernsey
Fort Richmond, Guernsey
Fort Saumarez
Fort Hommet
Vale Castle
Fort Duquemin
Bréhon Tower
Fort Grandes Rocques

Alderney
Château à L'Etoc
Essex Castle
Fort Albert
Fort Clonque
Fort Corblets
Fort Doyle
Fort Grosnez
Fort Homeaux Florains
Fort Houmet Herbe
Fort Platte Saline
Fort Quesnard
Fort Raz
Fort Tourgis

Jersey
 Câtel Fort
 Elizabeth Castle
 Fort Regent
 Fort Henry, Jersey
 Fort Leicester, Jersey
 Grosnez Castle
 La Crête Fort
 L’Etacquerel Fort
 Mont Orgueil
 Saint Aubin's Fort

See also
List of castles
Jersey Round Tower

Channel Islands
Castles
Channel Islands